Paulo Rebelo Costinha Castro (born 22 September 1973), known as Costinha, is a Portuguese former professional footballer who played as a goalkeeper.

He appeared in 229 Primeira Liga matches in 16 seasons, mainly with União de Leiria (six years) and Sporting CP (four).

Club career
Costinha was born in Braga. A product of Boavista FC's youth system, he went on to represent Primeira Liga clubs FC Porto and Sporting CP – being mostly a backup– as well as U.D. Leiria, where he established himself in the top flight.

After a short abroad stint with Spain's CD Tenerife, appearing rarely for the Segunda División team, Costinha joined C.F. Os Belenenses from Leiria for the 2006–07 season. He only was a starter in his first year as he lost his position after the January 2007 arrival of Brazilian Júlio César, being definitely released in the summer of 2009 without any further league appearances and retiring shortly after, aged 35.

International career
Costinha represented Portugal at the 1996 Summer Olympics, playing three matches out of six as the national side finished in fourth place. Previously, he appeared in all the games at the 1993 FIFA World Youth Championship in Australia, with the under-20s losing all three group-stage fixtures (five goals conceded).

Post-retirement
After retiring, Costinha settled in Leiria were he opened a tobacco shop. He also worked as a player agent and in a football academy.

References

External links

1973 births
Living people
Sportspeople from Braga
Portuguese footballers
Association football goalkeepers
Primeira Liga players
Boavista F.C. players
Sporting CP footballers
FC Porto players
U.D. Leiria players
C.F. Os Belenenses players
Segunda División players
CD Tenerife players
Portugal youth international footballers
Portugal under-21 international footballers
Olympic footballers of Portugal
Footballers at the 1996 Summer Olympics
Portuguese expatriate footballers
Expatriate footballers in Spain
Portuguese expatriate sportspeople in Spain